In organic chemistry, the acenes or polyacenes are a class of organic compounds and polycyclic aromatic hydrocarbons  made up of benzene rings which have been linearly fused. They follow the general molecular formula .

The larger representatives have potential interest in optoelectronic applications and are actively researched in chemistry and electrical engineering. Pentacene has been incorporated into organic field-effect transistors, reaching charge carrier mobilities as high as 5 cm2/Vs.

The first 5 unsubstituted members are listed in the following table:

Hexacene is not stable in air, and dimerises upon isolation. Heptacene (and larger acenes) is very reactive and has only been isolated in a matrix. However, bis(trialkylsilylethynylated) versions of heptacene have been isolated as crystalline solids.

Larger acenes
Due to their increased conjugation length the larger acenes are also studied. Theoretically, a number of reports are available on longer chains using density functional methods. They are also building blocks for nanotubes and graphene.  Unsubstituted octacene (n=8) and nonacene (n=9) have been detected in matrix isolation. The first reports of stable nonacene derivatives claimed that due to the electronic effects of the thioaryl substituents the compound is not a diradical but a closed-shell compound with the lowest HOMO-LUMO gap reported for any acene, an observation in violation of Kasha's rule.  Subsequent work by others on different derivatives included crystal structures, with no such violations. The on-surface synthesis and characterization of unsubstituted, parent nonacene (n=9) and decacene (n=10) have been reported. In 2020, scientists reported about the creation of dodecacene (n=12) for the first time.

Related compounds
The acene series have the consecutive rings linked in a linear chain, but other chain linkages are possible. The phenacenes have a zig-zag structure and the helicenes have a helical structure.

Benz[a]anthracene, an isomer of tetracene, has three rings connected in a line and one ring connected at an angle.

References

 
Conductive polymers
Organic semiconductors